Jennifer N. Carpenter (born October 13, 1965) is an American finance academic best known for her pioneering research into executive stock options. Other interests include fund manager compensation, survivorship bias, corporate bonds, and option pricing.  She has been published in numerous journals including the Journal of Finance, the Journal of Financial Economics, the Review of Financial Studies, and the Journal of Business.

She is a professor at NYU's School of Business, where she teaches MBA courses in debt instruments and markets, and at the PhD level, continuous time asset pricing and portfolio choice.  She also teaches for the Master of Science in Global Finance (MSGF), which is a joint program between Stern and the Hong Kong University of Science and Technology. Before joining NYU, Carpenter worked at Goldman Sachs & Co in the fixed income division, and she was also a lecturer at the University of Pennsylvania.

Carpenter received her BS in economics, MA in finance, MA in mathematics, and PhD in finance from the University of Pennsylvania.

She has presented "The Real Value of China's Stock Market" at various venues including the People's Bank of China, National Bureau of Economic Research,  the China Securities Regulatory Commission, the Shenzhen Stock Exchange and the Shanghai Stock Exchange.

Selected publications
, Cited 83 times, according to Scopus
 Cited 57 times, according to Scopus

References

New York University Stern School of Business faculty
1965 births
Living people
Place of birth missing (living people)
University of Pennsylvania alumni
American women academics
Academic staff of the Hong Kong University of Science and Technology
Financial economists
Goldman Sachs people
Wharton School of the University of Pennsylvania alumni
21st-century American women